Whyte's barbet (Stactolaema whytii) is a species of bird in the family Lybiidae (African barbets).  It is found in Malawi, Mozambique, Tanzania, Zambia, and Zimbabwe.

The common name and Latin binomial commemorate the naturalist Alexander Whyte, who collected in what is now Malawi.

The bird is 18–20.4 cm (7.1-8.0 inches) long and weighs 51-63 grams (1.8-2.2 ounces). It is mainly brownish with a large black bill, head, and tail. The bird has a white malar mark, wings, and tail. There is also a small red spot under the malar mark.

Subspecies
Stactolaema whytii includes the following subspecies:
 S. w. buttoni - (White, CMN, 1945)
 S. w. stresemanni - (Grote, 1934)
 S. w. terminata - (Clancey, 1956)
 S. w. angoniensis - (Benson, 1964)
 S. w. whytii - (Shelley, 1893)
 S. w. sowerbyi - Sharpe, 1898

References

External links

 Whyte's barbet - Species text in The Atlas of Southern African Birds

 https://www.hbw.com/species/whytes-barbet-stactolaema-whytii

Whyte's barbet
Birds of East Africa
Whyte's barbet
Taxonomy articles created by Polbot